Demir "D.J." Boldin  (born June 20, 1986) is an American football coach and former player who is currently the head coach at Lake Erie College. He has also served as an offensive assistant for the San Francisco 49ers of the National Football League. He played college football at Wake Forest. He signed with the Detroit Lions as an undrafted free agent in 2009.

Early years
Boldin was selected as the Defensive Player of the Year by the Palm Beach Post. He was an A first-team all-state selection. He recorded 107 tackles, two interceptions and four forced fumbles as a senior in high school, along with 29 receptions for 691 yards and nine touchdowns as a wide receiver He was selected to the first-team all-state as a linebacker.

College career

Redshirt Freshman
Boldin was named to The Sporting News' ACC All-Freshman Team. Boldin finished second on the team in receiving yards and fourth on the team in receptions. He played nine games and started six, where he recorded 15 receptions for 224 yards, a team-best 14.9 yards per catch. Boldin made his first career reception against Maryland, a 14-yard reception.  He had three catches against Clemson for 36 yards. Boldin also had a season-high four receptions in Tallahassee against Florida State for 58 yards and Boldin caught three passes for 54 yards at Boston College. He had two receptions for 15 yards at Georgia Tech. He did not play in the season opener against Vanderbilt because of a coach's decision and missed the Miami game with injury.

Sophomore season
In 2006, Boldin sat out his sophomore season due to academic reasons.

Junior season
Boldin recorded 11 reception for 127 yards while appearing in all 13 games in which he had a successful return in 2007 after missing the 2006 season. Caught his first pass since 2005 when he snagged a 14-yarder in the season opener vs. Boston College (Sept. 1) ... Had two receptions vs. Virginia (Nov. 3) and Clemson (Nov. 10) ... Made two receptions for 47 yards in the Meineke Car Care Bowl ... His longest catch of the season was a 38-yarder that led to a first down on a third-and-17 against Connecticut.

Senior
Boldin led the ACC with 81 receptions and 848 yards, with 3 touchdowns. Boldin was second in the ACC with 65 yards per game, and averaged over 10 yards per catch. Boldin was second behind North Carolina wide receiver Hakeem Nicks. He finished his career with 107 receptions, 1,199 yards, and 3 touchdowns.

Professional career

Detroit Lions
After going undrafted in the 2009 NFL Draft, Boldin signed with the Detroit Lions as an undrafted free agent. In September of 2009, Boldin was released on the day that final cuts were announced.

Toronto Argonauts
On October 19, 2010, Boldin signed with the Toronto Argonauts of the Canadian Football League. In the 2011 CFL season, Boldin recorded 3 receptions for 35 yards with the Argonauts.

Personal life
Boldin's older brother is retired National Football League wide receiver Anquan Boldin. He is the cousin of four-time CFL All-Star defensive back Korey Banks.

External links
 DJ Boldin profile at Argonauts.ca
 San Francisco 49ers bio

1986 births
Living people
American football wide receivers
Canadian football wide receivers
American players of Canadian football
Lake Erie Storm football coaches
San Francisco 49ers coaches
Toronto Argonauts players
Wake Forest Demon Deacons football players
High school football coaches in Florida
People from Pahokee, Florida
Coaches of American football from Florida
Players of American football from Florida